Spiridione Roma (1730–June 15, 1786), also known as Spiridon or Spyridon Romas, was a Greek painter from Corfu.  He was a prominent member of the Heptanese School.   His contemporary was Spyridon Sperantzas.  He was another painter from Corfu.  He also painted all over Italy and settled in Triste.  Romas painted on the Ionian Islands, Sicily, and Livorno before settling in England. He was one of the few Greek painters to travel to a foreign country outside of the Greek or Italian world. The other two were El Greco and Efstathios Altinis.  He was also a British painter during the last decades of his life.  He was active in the region from 1770 to 1786.  According to the Hellenic Institute, over twenty-five of his works survived.  He was the British El Greco.  His most popular work is a painting entitled The East Offering its Riches to Britannia.

History
Spyridon Romas was born in Corfu. His wife’s name was Margarita.  He had two daughters and a son.   The state archives of Livorno indicate in 1762 a letter of recommendation was sent from Corfu to the Greek community of Livorno on behalf of Spyridon Romas.  The painter signed a contract to decorate the Greek church of the Holy Trinity in Livorno in 1764 and 1766.  Twenty paintings were completed for the church.  He also completed work in Lecce, Sicily for the Greek church Chiesa Greco-Ortodossa di San Nicola.  He was active in Sicily and central Italy before traveling to England.  Archives indicate he was a prominent member of the Greek community in England.  He was invited in 1770.  He lived on Queen Anne St East. Records indicate his works were exhibited at the Royal Academy from 1774 to 1778.  According to newspaper advertisements, he was a painter but also maintained paintings.  Towards the end of his life, he worked for nobles, collectors, and art lovers.  He was also associated with the Earl of Egremont  He died on June 15, 1786.

His art drastically revolutionized the painting style of the Heptanese School.  He followed the path of the Panayiotis Doxaras and his contemporaries.  He refined traditional paintings of the Cretan School bringing the work into the more sophisticated Stile di pittura Ionico or stile Ionico. Romas was a proponent of the Ionian style.  His works reflect his advanced knowledge of the style prevalent in the region.  His painting style further evolved when he was exposed to Anglican paintings.  He is one of the few Greek painters to completely abandon his Greek Italian painting roots.

Britannia
He is best known for an allegorical ceiling piece, The East Offering its Riches to Britannia (1778), commissioned by the East India Company for the Revenue Committee Room in the East India House in London. The painting generally represents the era's panegyric to Britain's imperial and colonialist domination.  The painting is described in the Gentleman's Magazine of 1778 as follows:

The painting is now in the Foreign and Commonwealth Office in London. A reproduction is held in the British Library in London. Other works by Roma in the British National Trust collections include An Illusionistic Gothic Patron's Pew, in the Extension of the Chapel  (c.1769/1771).

Gallery

See also
Constantine Rodocanachi
Christopher Angelus

References

Bibliography

1730 births
1786 deaths
18th-century Italian painters
Italian male painters
Italian Baroque painters
18th-century English painters
English male painters
18th-century Greek painters
Greek Baroque painters
Painters of the Heptanese School
Artists from Corfu
18th-century English male artists
18th-century Italian male artists